Duke Qing may refer to:

Duke Qing of Qi (died 582 BC)
Duke Qing of Jin (died 512 BC)